Alex Charette (born January 9, 1992) is a professional Canadian football wide receiver for the Montreal Alouettes of the Canadian Football League (CFL). He was a member of the 105th Grey Cup champion Toronto Argonauts. He played CIS football for the Guelph Gryphons.

Early career
Alex started his football career at Saint Francis Catholic Secondary School in St. Catharines, Ontario and went on to become the first Phoenix graduate to be drafted to a professional sports team. In addition to playing for his high school he played in the Ontario Varsity Football League (OVFL) for the Niagara Spears from 2005 to 2009. In university, he played Canadian Interuniversity Sport (CIS) football with the Guelph Gryphons.

Professional career
He was drafted in the fourth round, 36th overall by the Montreal Alouettes and played for two full seasons with the team before being released shortly into his third season on June 26, 2017. He signed with the Argonauts on August 7, 2017 and played in five games with the team while being on the injured list during their 105th Grey Cup victory. He played in 37 games over three seasons with the Argonauts and was released on February 5, 2020. He signed with Edmonton soon after, but following the cancelled 2020 CFL season, he was released on January 9, 2021.

On August 6, 2021, it was announced that Charette had signed with the Montreal Alouettes.

References

External links
Montreal Alouettes bio 

1992 births
Living people
Black Canadian players of Canadian football
Canadian football wide receivers
Guelph Gryphons football players
Sportspeople from St. Catharines
Toronto Argonauts players
Players of Canadian football from Ontario
Montreal Alouettes players
Edmonton Elks players